Léo Campion (born Léon Louis Octave Campion; 24 March 1905 in Paris – 6 March 1992 in Paris) was a French actor and active freemason.

References

Pataphysicians
1905 births
1992 deaths
Male actors from Paris
French anarchists
French male film actors
French male television actors
20th-century French male actors
French Freemasons